Glengarry School Days is a 1923 Canadian silent drama film directed by Henry MacRae and starring Harlan Knight, James Harrison and Pauline Garon. It is based on the novel of the same title by Ralph Connor. It was distributed in the United States by Hodkinson Pictures with the alternative title of The Critical Age.

It was the last of three pictures based on works by Connor directed by MacRae for Canadian producer Ernest Shipman following Cameron of the Royal Mounted and The Man from Glengarry.

Cast
 Harlan Knight as Peter Gorach
 James Harrison as Tom Finley
 Alice May as Mrs. Finley
 Pauline Garon as Margie Baird
 Wallace Ray as Bob Kerr
 Raymond Peck as Sen. Morgan Kerr
 William Colvin as Senator Baird
 Marion Colvin as Mrs. Baird

References

Bibliography
 Goble, Alan. The Complete Index to Literary Sources in Film. Walter de Gruyter, 1999.

External links
 

1923 films
1923 drama films
English-language Canadian films
Canadian silent films
Canadian drama films
Canadian black-and-white films
Films distributed by W. W. Hodkinson Corporation
Films directed by Henry MacRae
1920s Canadian films
Silent drama films